Southwest Island is an uninhabited
,  island in the southwest corner of St. Margarets Bay, Nova Scotia.

References

Landforms of Lunenburg County, Nova Scotia
Islands of St. Margarets Bay, Nova Scotia
Uninhabited islands of Canada